Leigh Ignatius Julius (born 25 March 1985) is a South African sprinter.

Julius was born in Cradock, Eastern Cape, He represented South Africa at the 2008 Summer Olympics in Beijing. He competed at the 4x100 metres relay together with Hannes Dreyer, Ishmael Kumbane and Thuso Mpuang. In their qualification heat they did not finish due to a mistake in the baton exchange and they were eliminated.

Competition record

Personal bests
100 metres - 10.25 s (2007)
200 metres - 20.42 s (2010)
400 metres - 46.59 s (2004)

References

External links
 
 
 

1985 births
African Games gold medalists for South Africa
African Games medalists in athletics (track and field)
Athletes (track and field) at the 2002 Commonwealth Games
Athletes (track and field) at the 2004 Summer Olympics
Athletes (track and field) at the 2006 Commonwealth Games
Athletes (track and field) at the 2008 Summer Olympics
Commonwealth Games medallists in athletics
Commonwealth Games silver medallists for South Africa
Living people
Olympic athletes of South Africa
South African male sprinters
Universiade medalists in athletics (track and field)
Athletes (track and field) at the 2007 All-Africa Games
Universiade gold medalists for South Africa
Universiade silver medalists for South Africa
Universiade bronze medalists for South Africa
Medalists at the 2003 Summer Universiade
Medalists at the 2005 Summer Universiade
Medalists at the 2007 Summer Universiade
Medalists at the 2009 Summer Universiade
People from Cradock, Eastern Cape
Sportspeople from the Eastern Cape
20th-century South African people
21st-century South African people
Medallists at the 2006 Commonwealth Games